Austrocarina is a genus of small predatory sea snails, marine gastropod mollusks in the family Horaiclavidae.

It was formerly included within the family Pseudomelatomidae.

Species
Species within the genus Austrocarina include:
 Austrocarina recta (Hedley, 1903)

References

External links
  Tucker, J.K. 2004 Catalog of recent and fossil turrids (Mollusca: Gastropoda). Zootaxa 682:1-1295.

 
Horaiclavidae
Monotypic gastropod genera